Edean may refer to:
Edean Anderson Ihlanfeldt (born 1930), American amateur female golfer
Roman Catholic Diocese of Edéa, Cameroon
Another name for Kashyyyk, a fictional planet in the Star Wars universe

See also
Edea (disambiguation)